Antoniewo Górne  is a village in the administrative district of Gmina Skoki, within Wągrowiec County, Greater Poland Voivodeship, in west-central Poland.

References

Villages in Wągrowiec County